

The Adziogol Lighthouse, also known as Stanislav–Adzhyhol Lighthouse or Stanislav Range Rear light, is one of two vertical lattice hyperboloid structures of steel bars, serving as active lighthouses in Dnieper Estuary, Ukraine.

Location
Together with the Stanislav Range Front Light (Small Adzhyhol Lighthouse), it serves as a range light, guiding ships entering the Dnieper River or the Southern Buh River within the vast Dnieper-Bug Estuary.

Details
The lighthouse was designed in 1910 and built in 1911 by Vladimir Shukhov. The one-story keeper's house sits inside the base of the tower.

The site of the tower is accessible only by boat. The site is open to the public but the tower is closed.

See also 
List of lighthouses in Ukraine
Thin-shell structure
List of hyperboloid structures
List of thin shell structures
List of tallest lighthouses in the world

References

Further reading
 
 
 
 Rainer Graefe:  “Vladimir G. Šuchov 1853–1939 – Die Kunst der sparsamen Konstruktion.”, S.192, Stuttgart, DVA, 1990, . 
 Peter Gössel, Gabriele Leuthäuser, Eva Schickler: “Architecture in the 20th century”, Taschen Verlag; 1990,  and 
 Kevin Matthews, "The Great Buildings Collection", CD-ROM, Artifice, 2001, .
 Elizabeth Cooper English:  “Arkhitektura i mnimosti”: The origins of Soviet avant-garde rationalist architecture in the Russian mystical-philosophical and mathematical intellectual tradition”, a dissertation in architecture, 264p., University of Pennsylvania, 2000.

External links
 
 Adziogol Lighthouse – video, 2010
 Photos of Adzhyhol Lighthouse.
 Adzhyhol lighthouses and the mouth of Dnieper. VeniVidi.ru

Lighthouses completed in 1911
Lattice shell structures by Vladimir Shukhov
Hyperboloid structures
High-tech architecture
Lighthouses in Ukraine
Dnieper–Bug estuary
Towers in Ukraine
Buildings and structures in Kherson Oblast
1911 establishments in the Russian Empire